The Vermilion River, in Kootenay National Park, is headwatered at Vermilion Pass and flows through Vermilion Valley in British Columbia, Canada. Its tributaries include the Simpson River, Tokumm Creek, and Verendrye Creek. It is a major tributary of the Kootenay River.

First visited (by a non-Aboriginal) by Sir George Simpson in 1841. 

Numa Falls on the river is directly accessible from Highway 93 in Kootenay National Park.

References 

Historic Milestones of Kootenay National Park
Kootenay NP

Rivers of British Columbia
East Kootenay
Rivers of the Canadian Rockies
Tributaries of the Kootenay River
Kootenay Land District